Belene is a town in Pleven Province, Northern Bulgaria. It is the administrative centre of the homonymous Belene Municipality. The town is situated on the right bank of the Danube river, close to the town of Svishtov.

Geography

Location 
Belene is located in Pleven Province - 60 km northeast of the regional centre of Pleven and near the town of Svishtov - 26 km. Other nearby towns are Nikopol - 37 km west of Belene and Levski to the south - 46 km.

Belene Municipality is located in the northern central part of the Danube Plain, on the northern state border of Bulgaria with Romania . The territory of the municipality is 285,046 decares (285 km²), of which 12,110 decares are the “settlements” fund. For its area it is one of the small municipalities in Bulgaria. It consists of six settlements - the municipal center of Belene and five villages - Dekov, Tatari, Petokladentsi, Kulina voda and Byala voda. The number of inhabitants in the Municipality accounts to 9891.

Climate 
Belene has a continental climate (Köppen climate classification Dfa) The winters are one of the coldest in Bulgaria but in the summer it gets very hot.

History 
Belene is a town with nearly ten centuries of history. Life here has existed since ancient times. Five cultural layers have been found in the localized over 20 Thracian mounds. The first ones date from the late Neolithic, continue through the Bronze and Copper Ages and are evidence of continuous life in these places for 1200 years. From the IV century BC. until the beginning of the I century. these lands were inhabited by the Thracian tribe Getae, also called Dimenzi. Belene originated on the site of an ancient Thracian settlement, later a Roman fortress and customs station Dimum, which lasted until the 1st century. The available data determine its origin in 1086, when part of the Paulician population after the suppression of the Thracian uprising left the surroundings of Plovdiv and settled near the destroyed and depopulated ancient Roman fortress Dimum (Dum).

In the Middle Ages the settlement was called Dunavgrad (Tunaburgos). Traces of a Slavic settlement and an earth fortification have been found in the vicinity of Belene. There is no summary information about the settlement for the period from the 5th to the 15th century.

The village is mentioned in Ottoman registers from 1479/80, at that time it was a Paulician village with 49 households. Later, the Paulicians from the village converted to Catholicism. About 18 names of the settlement are known from the history and legends. The most popular are: Dimum, Pavlikjansko Belene, Beljansko, Beleni. The Paulicians who settled in it profess one of the varieties of the Bogomilism. On the one hand, they oppose Christianity, and on the other, they do not want to accept Islam. In order to save and mitigate the Turkish atrocities from 1605 to 1620, the Paulicians were converted to the Catholic faith by the Bosnian Catholic missionary Bishop Petar Solinat. Despite its admission into the bosom of the Roman Catholic Church, the population retains its language and nationality. The adoption of the Catholic faith has a beneficial effect on the development of Belene.

According to Lyubomir Miletich after the pogrom of the Chiprovtsi uprising in 1688, about 2,000 people from Belene moved to Wallachia to escape the Turkish atrocities. After a while, some of them return, but some have already mastered the Romanian language and customs. After the Russo-Turkish War of Liberation from 1877-1878, the Turks emigrated and Bulgarians from the Gabrovo, Elena, Tryavna and Tarnovo regions settled, leaving Belene with a purely Bulgarian population.

On 7th of September 1964 Belene was proclaimed a city. Here was located the biggest labour camp in Bulgaria (Belene labour camp) after the BCP gained power in 1944. It was created on the island of Persin (also known as island Belene) on the Danube during the spring of 1949 with the intentions to put all the prisoners in the country.

Religion 
The main confessions in the town are Roman Catholicism and Eastern Orthodoxy, with two Roman Catholic and one Orthodox church being present. The Catholic Church of the Blessed Virgin Mary was built in 1860, the Eastern Orthodox Church of St George in 1874 and the Catholic Church of Saint Anthony of Padua was constructed in 1893.

Belene is the birthplace of Blessed Bishop Eugene Bosilkov (1900 - 1952), a martyr for the faith and beatified on March 15, 1998 in St. Peter's Basilica by Pope John Paul II In the Church of the Nativity of the Blessed Virgin Mary is the Sanctuary with a piece of the relics of Monsignor Bosilkov - a place of worship for believing Christians.

Belene was proclaimed a town in 1964, which is celebrated every year in the first week of September with a market and cultural events.

Economy 
Although about 40% of construction worked and 80% of equipment deliveries for the first unit had been completed in 1991, construction was suspended owing to a lack of financial resources. In 2002, the Government decided to resume the Belene NPP Project and in 2005, the Council of Ministers issued a decision for construction of two 1000 MW units. However, the Council of Ministers decision about the Belene NPP Project was subsequently suspended in 2012. In 2018, the Minister of Energy was assigned to again explore possibilities for construction of the Belene NPP until it was interrupted in 1990 due to the severe economic crisis that followed the fall of communism in the country. There are plans to start construction again as a replacement for reactors 3 and 4 at Kozloduy Nuclear Power Plant, which Bulgaria shut down as a condition for EU membership. The total capacity of the two reactors will be 2,000 MW.

In popular culture 
Belene was the focal point for the feature documentary film The Mosquito Problem and Other Stories by Andrey Paounov
The film features some of the town's characters, highlighting their daily plight of a nuclear plant of empty promises and a year-round mosquito epidemic.

Notable people

Born in Belene 

 Eugene Bossilkov (1900 – 1952), member of the Passionist Congregation, Roman Catholic bishop of Nikopol and martyr in the Communist campaign in Bulgaria against religion
 Mihail Borozenkov, adventurer
 Karl Raev (1881 – 1967), catholic priest
 Nikola Aleksiev (.... – 1964), first legislator from Belene

Lived in Belene 

 Damjan Talev (1911 – 1998), catholic priest
 Petko Hristov (1950 – 2020) Roman Catholic bishop of Nikopol
 Paolo Kortezi (born 1974), catholic priest, passionist

Died in Belene 

 Ilolito Agosto (1838 – 1893), Roman Catholic bishop of Nikopol
 Alexander Girginov (1879 – 1953), politician
 Dimitar Savov (1887 – 1951), politician
 Ignat Badov (1919 – 2001), catholic priest, resurrectionist

International relations

Twin towns — sister cities
Belene is twinned with:

 Belleville-sur-Loire, France
 Devrek, Turkey
 Hajdúsámson, Hungary
 Lázně Bělohrad, Czech Republic
 Obninsk, Russia
 Popești-Leordeni, Romania
 Vigonza, Italy

References

 
Populated places in Pleven Province
Populated places on the Danube
Late Neolithic